A coffeehouse, coffee shop, or café is an establishment that primarily serves coffee of various types, notably espresso, latte, and cappuccino. Some coffeehouses may serve cold drinks, such as iced coffee and iced tea, as well as other non-caffeinated beverages. In continental Europe, cafés serve alcoholic drinks. A coffeehouse may also serve food, such as light snacks, sandwiches, muffins, fruit, or pastries. Coffeehouses range from owner-operated small businesses to large multinational corporations. Some coffeehouse chains operate on a franchise business model, with numerous branches across various countries around the world.

While café may refer to a coffeehouse, the term "café" generally refers to a diner, British café (colloquially called a "caff"), "greasy spoon" (a small and inexpensive restaurant), transport café, teahouse or tea room, or other casual eating and drinking place. A coffeehouse may share some of the same characteristics of a bar or restaurant, but it is different from a cafeteria. Many coffeehouses in the Middle East and in West Asian immigrant districts in the Western world offer shisha (actually called nargile in Levantine Arabic, Greek and Turkish), flavored tobacco smoked through a hookah. An espresso bar is a type of coffeehouse that specializes in serving espresso and espresso-based drinks.

From a cultural standpoint, coffeehouses largely serve as centers of social interaction: a coffeehouse provides patrons with a place to congregate, talk, read, write, entertain one another, or pass the time, whether individually or in small groups. Since the popularization of Wi-Fi, coffeehouses with this capability have also become places for patrons to access the Internet on their laptops and tablet computers. A coffeehouse can serve as an informal club for its regular members. As early as the 1950s Beatnik era and the 1960s folk music scene, coffeehouses have hosted singer-songwriter performances, typically in the evening.

Etymology

The most common English spelling café, is the French, Portuguese, and Spanish spelling, and was adopted by English-speaking countries in the late 19th century. The Italian spelling, caffè, is also sometimes used in English.

The English words coffee and café derive from the Italian word for coffee, caffè—first attested as caveé in Venice in 1570—and in turn derived from Arabic qahwa. The Arabic term qahwa originally referred to a type of wine, but after the wine ban by Islam, the name was transferred to coffee because of the similar rousing effect it induced. European knowledge of coffee (the plant, its seeds, and the drink made from the seeds) came through European contact with Turkey, likely via Venetian-Ottoman trade relations.

The English word café to describe a restaurant that usually serves coffee and snacks rather than the word coffee that describes the drink, is derived from the French café. The first café in France is believed to have opened in 1660. The first café in Europe is believed to have been opened in Belgrade, Serbia in 1522 as a Kafana (Serbian coffee house).

The translingual word root /kafe/ appears in many European languages with various naturalized spellings, including Portuguese, Spanish, and French (café); German (Kaffee); Polish (kawa); Serbian (кафа / kafa); Ukrainian (кава, 'kava'); and others.

History

Islamic world

The first coffeehouses in the Islamic world, qahveh khaneh (Persian for coffee house), appeared in Damascus. These Ottoman coffeehouses also appeared in Mecca, in the Arabian Peninsula in the 15th century, then spread to the Ottoman Empire's capital of Istanbul in the 16th century. Coffeehouses became popular meeting places where people gathered to drink coffee, have conversations, play board games such as chess and backgammon, listen to stories and music, and discuss news and politics. They became known as "schools of wisdom" for the type of clientele they attracted, and their free and frank discourse.

Coffeehouses in Mecca became a concern of imams who viewed them as places for political gatherings and drinking, leading to bans between 1512 and 1524. However, these bans could not be maintained, due to coffee becoming ingrained in daily ritual and culture across the Islamic world. The Ottoman chronicler İbrahim Peçevi reports in his writings (1642–49) about the opening of the first coffeehouse in Istanbul:

Various legends involving the introduction of coffee to Istanbul at a "Kiva Han" in the late 15th century circulate in culinary tradition, but with no documentation.

The 17th century French traveler and writer Jean Chardin gave a lively description of the Persian coffeehouse scene:

Europe

In the 17th century, coffee appeared for the first time in Europe outside the Ottoman Empire, and coffeehouses were established, soon becoming increasingly popular. The first coffeehouse is said to have appeared in 1632 in Livorno, founded by a Jewish merchant, or later in 1640, in Venice. In the 19th and 20th centuries in Europe, coffeehouses were very often meeting points for writers and artists.

England 
The first coffeehouse in England was set up in Oxford in 1650–1651 by "Jacob the Jew". A second competing coffee house was opened across the street in 1654, by "Cirques Jobson, the Jew" (Queen's Lane Coffee House).
In London, the earliest coffeehouse was established by Pasqua Rosée in 1652.
Anthony Wood observed of the coffee houses of Oxford in his Life and Times (1674) "The decay of study, and consequently of learning, are coffee houses, to which most scholars retire and spend much of the day in hearing and  speaking of news". The proprietor was Pasqua Rosée, the servant of a trader in goods from the Ottoman Empire named Daniel Edwards, who imported the coffee and assisted Rosée in setting up the establishment there.

From 1670 to 1685, the number of London coffeehouses began to increase, and they also began to gain political importance due to their popularity as places of debate. English coffeehouses in the 17th and 18th centuries were significant meeting places, particularly in London. By 1675, there were more than 3,000 coffeehouses in England. Coffeehouses were also known as "penny universities" because of the crowd that they attracted. Scholars and students alike were regulars, and anyone with a penny could enter and sit in on a lecture or have access to books or print news. Coffeehouses boosted the popularity of print news culture and helped the growth of various financial markets including insurance, stocks, and auctions.  

Though Charles II later tried to suppress London coffeehouses as "places where the disaffected met, and spread scandalous reports concerning the conduct of His Majesty and his Ministers", the public still flocked to them. For several decades following the Restoration, the wits gathered around John Dryden at Will's Coffee House, in Russell Street, Covent Garden. As coffeehouses were believed to be areas where anti-government gossip could easily spread, Queen Mary and the London City magistrates tried to prosecute people who frequent coffeehouses as they were liable to "spread false and seditious reports". William III's privy council also suppressed Jacobite sympathizers in the 1680s and 1690s in coffeehouses as these were the places that they believed harbored plotters against the regimes.

The coffeehouses were great social levelers, open to all men and indifferent to social status, and as a result associated with equality and republicanism. The rich intellectual atmosphere of early London coffeehouses were available to anyone who could pay the sometimes one penny entry fee, giving them the name of 'Penny Universities'.

More generally, coffeehouses became meeting places where business could be carried on, news exchanged and the London Gazette (government announcements) read. Lloyd's of London had its origins in a coffeehouse run by Edward Lloyd, where underwriters of ship insurance met to do business. By 1739, there were 551 coffeehouses in London; each attracted a particular clientele divided by occupation or attitude, such as Tories and Whigs, wits and stockjobbers, merchants and lawyers, booksellers and authors, men of fashion or the "cits" of the old city center. According to one French visitor, Antoine François Prévost, coffeehouses, "where you have the right to read all the papers for and against the government", were the "seats of English liberty".

Jonathan's Coffee House in 1698 saw the listing of stock and commodity prices that evolved into the London Stock Exchange. Lloyd's Coffee House provided the venue for merchants and shippers to discuss insurance deals, leading to the establishment of Lloyd's of London insurance market, the Lloyd's Register classification society, and other related businesses. Auctions in salesrooms attached to coffeehouses provided the start for the great auction houses of Sotheby's and Christie's.

In Victorian England, the temperance movement set up coffeehouses (also known as coffee taverns) for the working classes, as a place of relaxation free of alcohol, an alternative to the public house.

France 
Pasqua Rosée, an Armenian by the name Harutiun Vartian, also established the first coffeehouse in Paris in 1672 and held a citywide coffee monopoly until Procopio Cutò, his apprentice, opened the Café Procope in 1686. This coffeehouse still exists today and was a popular meeting place of the French Enlightenment; Voltaire, Rousseau, and Denis Diderot frequented it, and it is arguably the birthplace of the Encyclopédie, the first modern encyclopedia.

Wallachia 
In 1667, Kara Hamie, a former Ottoman Janissary from Constantinople, opened the first coffee shop in Bucharest (then the capital of the Principality of Wallachia), in the center of the city, where today sits the main building of the National Bank of Romania.

Austria 

The traditional tale of the origins of the Viennese café begins with the mysterious sacks of green beans left behind when the Turks were defeated in the Battle of Vienna in 1683. All the sacks of coffee were granted to the victorious Polish king Jan III Sobieski, who in turn gave them to one of his officers, Jerzy Franciszek Kulczycki, a Ukrainian cossack and Polish diplomat of Ruthenian descent. Kulczycki, according to the tale, then began the first coffeehouse in Vienna with the hoard, also being the first to serve coffee with milk. There is a statue of Kulczycki on a street also named after him. 

However, it is now widely accepted that the first Viennese coffeehouse was actually opened by an Armenian merchant named Johannes Diodato (Asdvadzadur). Johannes Diodato (also known as Johannes Theodat) opened a registered coffeehouse in Vienna in 1685. Fifteen years later, four other Armenians owned coffeehouses. The culture of drinking coffee was itself widespread in the country in the second half of the 18th century.

Over time, a special coffee house culture developed in Habsburg Vienna. On the one hand, writers, artists, musicians, intellectuals, bon vivants and their financiers met in the coffee house, and on the other hand, new coffee varieties were always served. In the coffee house, people played cards or chess, worked, read, thought, composed, discussed, argued, observed and just chatted. A lot of information was also obtained in the coffee house, because local and foreign newspapers were freely available to all guests. This form of coffee house culture spread throughout the Habsburg Empire in the 19th century.
 
Scientific theories, political plans but also artistic projects were worked out and discussed in Viennese coffee houses all over Central Europe. James Joyce even enjoyed his coffee in a Viennese coffee house on the Adriatic in Trieste, then and now the main port for coffee and coffee processing in Italy and Central Europe. From there, the Viennese Kapuziner coffee developed into today's world-famous cappuccino. This special multicultural atmosphere of the Habsburg coffee houses was largely destroyed by the later National Socialism and Communism and can only be found today in a few places that have long been in the slipstream of history, such as Vienna or Trieste.

Italy 

During the 18th century, the oldest extant coffeehouses in Italy were established: Caffè Florian in Venice, Antico Caffè Greco in Rome, Caffè Pedrocchi in Padua, Caffè dell'Ussero in Pisa and Caffè Fiorio in Turin.

Hungary 
The first known cafes in Pest date back to 1714 when a house intended to serve as a Cafe (Balázs Kávéfőző) was purchased. Minutes of the Pest City Council from 1729 mention complaints by the Balázs cafe and Franz Reschfellner Cafe against the Italian-originated cafe of Francesco Bellieno for selling underpriced coffee.

Ireland 
In the 18th century, Dublin coffeehouses functioned as early reading centers and the emergence of circulation and subscription libraries that provided greater access to printed material for the public. The interconnectivity of the coffeehouse and virtually every aspect of the print trade were evidenced by the incorporation of printing, publishing, selling, and viewing of newspapers, pamphlets and books on the premises, most notably in the case of Dick's Coffee House, owned by Richard Pue; thus contributing to a culture of reading and increased literacy. These coffeehouses were a social magnet where different strata of society came together to discuss topics covered by the newspapers and pamphlets. Most coffeehouses of the 18th century would eventually be equipped with their own printing presses or incorporate a book shop.

Today, the term café  is used for most coffeehouses - this can be spelled both with and without an acute accent, but is always pronounced as two syllables. The name café has also come to be used for a type of diners that offers cooked meals (again, without alcoholic beverages) which can be standalone or operating within in shopping centres or department stores.  In Irish usage, the presence or absence of the acute accent does not signify the type of establishment (coffeehouse versus diner), and is purely a decision by the owner: for instance, the two largest diner-style café chains in Ireland during in the 1990s were named "Kylemore Cafe" and "Bewley’s Café" - i.e., one written without, and one with, the acute accent.

Switzerland 
In 1761 the Turm Kaffee, a shop for exported goods, was opened in St. Gallen.

Gender 
The exclusion of women from coffeehouses was not universal, but does appear to have been common in Europe. In Germany, women frequented them, but in England and France they were banned. Émilie du Châtelet purportedly cross-dressed to gain entrance to a coffeehouse in Paris.

In a well-known engraving of a Parisian café c. 1700, the gentlemen hang their hats on pegs and sit at long communal tables strewn with papers and writing implements. Coffee pots are ranged at an open fire, with a hanging cauldron of boiling water. The only woman present presides, separated in a canopied booth, from which she serves coffee in tall cups.

Contemporary 
In most European countries, such as Spain, Austria, Denmark, Germany, Norway, Sweden, Portugal, and others, the term café means a restaurant primarily serving coffee, as well as pastries such as cakes, tarts, pies, or buns. Many cafés also serve light meals such as sandwiches. European cafés often have tables on the pavement (sidewalk) as well as indoors. Some cafés also serve alcoholic drinks (e.g., wine), particularly in Southern Europe. In the Netherlands and Belgium, a café is the equivalent of a bar, and also sells alcoholic drinks. In the Netherlands a koffiehuis serves coffee, while a coffee shop (using the English term) sells "soft" drugs (cannabis and hashish) and is generally not allowed to sell alcoholic drinks. In France, most cafés serve as lunch restaurants in the day, and bars in the evening. They generally do not have pastries except in the mornings, when a croissant or pain au chocolat can be purchased with breakfast coffee. In Italy, cafés are similar to those found in France and known as bar. They typically serve a variety of espresso coffee, cakes and alcoholic drinks. Bars in city centers usually have different prices for consumption at the bar and consumption at a table.

Americas

Argentina 

Coffeehouses are part of the culture of Buenos Aires and the customs of its inhabitants. They are traditional meeting places for 'porteños' and have inspired innumerable artistic creations. Some notable coffeehouses include Confitería del Molino, Café Tortoni, El Gato Negro, Café La Biela.

United States

The first coffeehouse in America opened in Boston, in 1676. However, Americans did not start choosing coffee over tea until the Boston Tea Party and the Revolutionary War. After the Revolutionary War, Americans momentarily went back to drinking tea until after the War of 1812 when they began importing high-quality coffee from Latin America and expensive inferior-quality tea from American shippers instead of Great Britain. Whether they were drinking coffee or tea, coffeehouses served a similar purpose that they did in Great Britain as places where business was done. In the 1780s, Merchant's Coffee House located on Wall Street in New York City was home to the organization of the Bank of New York and the New York Chamber of Commerce.

Coffeehouses in the United States arose from the espresso- and pastry-centered Italian coffeehouses of the Italian American immigrant communities in the major U.S. cities, notably New York City's Little Italy and Greenwich Village, Boston's North End, and San Francisco's North Beach. From the late 1950s onward, coffeehouses also served as a venue for entertainment, most commonly folk performers during the American folk music revival. Both Greenwich Village and North Beach became major haunts of the Beats, who were highly identified with these coffeehouses. As the youth culture of the 1960s evolved, non-Italians consciously copied these coffeehouses. The political nature of much of 1960s folk music made the music a natural tie-in with coffeehouses with their association with political action. A number of well-known performers like Joan Baez and Bob Dylan began their careers performing in coffeehouses. Blues singer Lightnin' Hopkins bemoaned his woman's inattentiveness to her domestic situation due to her overindulgence in coffeehouse socializing in his 1969 song "Coffeehouse Blues". 

In 1966, Alfred Peet began applying the dark roast style to high quality beans and opened up a small shop in Berkeley, California to educate customers on the virtues of good coffee. Starting in 1967 with the opening of the historic Last Exit on Brooklyn coffeehouse, Seattle became known for its thriving countercultural coffeehouse scene; the Starbucks chain later standardized and mainstreamed this espresso bar model.  

From the 1960s through the mid-1980s, churches and individuals in the United States used the coffeehouse concept for outreach. They were often storefronts and had names like The Lost Coin (Greenwich Village), The Gathering Place (Riverside, CA), Catacomb Chapel (New York City), and Jesus For You (Buffalo, NY). Christian music (often guitar-based) was performed, coffee and food was provided, and Bible studies were convened as people of varying backgrounds gathered in a casual setting that was purposefully different from traditional churches. An out-of-print book, published by the ministry of David Wilkerson, titled, A Coffeehouse Manual, served as a guide for Christian coffeehouses, including a list of name suggestions for coffeehouses.

They are popular to this day with coffeehouses such as Starbucks seeming to be on every corner of streets in several major American cities including Los Angeles and Seattle.

Format

Cafés may have an outdoor section (terrace, pavement or sidewalk café) with seats, tables and parasols. This is especially the case with European cafés. Cafés offer a more open public space compared to many of the traditional pubs they have replaced, which were more male dominated with a focus on drinking alcohol.

One of the original uses of the café, as a place for information exchange and communication, was reintroduced in the 1990s with the Internet café or Hotspot. The spread of modern-style cafés to urban and rural areas went hand-in-hand with the rising use of mobile computers. Computers and Internet access in a contemporary-styled venue help to create a youthful, modern place, compared to the traditional pubs or old-fashioned diners that they replaced.

Middle East and Asia
In the Middle East, the coffeehouse ( maqha;  qahveh-khaneh;  or kırâthane) serves as an important social gathering place for men. Men assemble in coffeehouses to drink coffee (usually Arabic coffee) and tea. In addition, men go there to listen to music, read books, play chess and backgammon, watch TV and enjoy other social activities around the Arab world and in Turkey. Hookah (shisha) is traditionally served as well.

Coffeehouses in Egypt are colloquially called ahwah , which is the dialectal pronunciation of  qahwah (literally "coffee") (see also Arabic phonology#Local variations). Also commonly served in ahwah are tea (shāy) and herbal teas, especially the highly popular hibiscus blend (Egyptian Arabic: karkadeh or ennab). The first ahwah opened around the 1850s and were originally patronized mostly by older people, with youths frequenting but not always ordering. There were associated by the 1920s with clubs (Cairo), bursa  (Alexandria) and gharza (rural inns). In the early 20th century, some of them became crucial venues for political and social debates.

In India, coffee culture has expanded in the past twenty years. Chains like Indian Coffee House, Café Coffee Day, Barista Lavazza have become very popular. Cafes are considered good venues to conduct office meetings and for friends to meet.

In China, an abundance of recently started domestic coffeehouse chains may be seen accommodating business people for conspicuous consumption, with coffee prices sometimes even higher than in the West.

In Malaysia and Singapore, traditional breakfast and coffee shops are called kopi tiam. The word is a portmanteau of the Malay word for coffee (as borrowed and altered from English) and the Hokkien dialect word for shop (POJ: tiàm). Menus typically feature simple offerings: a variety of foods based on egg, toast, and coconut jam, plus coffee, tea, and Milo, a malted chocolate drink that is extremely popular in Southeast Asia and Australasia, particularly Singapore and Malaysia.

In the Philippines, coffee shop chains like Starbucks have become the prevalent hangouts for upper and middle class professionals in such districts as the Makati CBD. However, carinderias (small eateries) continue to serve coffee alongside breakfast and snack dishes. Events called "Kapihan" (fora) are often held inside bakeshops or restaurants that also serve coffee for breakfast or merienda.

In Thailand, the term "café" is not only a coffeehouse in the international definition, as in other countries, but in the past was considered a night restaurant that serves alcoholic drinks during a comedy show on stage. The era in which this type of business flourished was the 1990s, before the 1997 financial crisis. 

The first real coffeehouse in Thailand opened in 1917 at the Si Kak Phraya Si in the area of Rattanakosin Island, by Madam Cole, an American woman who living in Thailand at that time, Later, Chao Phraya Ram Rakop (เจ้าพระยารามราฆพ), Thai aristocrat, opened a coffeehouse named "Café de Norasingha" (คาเฟ่นรสิงห์) located at Sanam Suea Pa (สนามเสือป่า), the ground next to the Royal Plaza. At present, Café de Norasingha has been renovated and moved to within Phayathai Palace. In the southern region, a traditional coffeehouse or kopi tiam is popular with locals, like many countries in the Malay Peninsula.

Australia

In the 19th Century, coffee houses such as the Collingwood Coffee Palace or the Federal Coffee Palace in the centre of Melbourne were established and were part of the temperance movement to reduce the consumption of alcohol in society.

In modern Australia, coffee shops are ubiquitously known as cafés. Since the post-World War II influx of Italian immigrants introduced the first espresso coffee machines to Australia in the 1950s, there was initially a slow rise in café culture, particularly in Melbourne, until a boom in locally owned cafés Australia-wide began in the 1990s. Alongside the rise in the number of cafés there has been a rise in demand for locally (or on-site) roasted specialty coffee, particularly in Sydney and Melbourne. A local favourite is the "flat white" which remains a popular coffee drink.

Africa
In Cairo, the capital of Egypt, most cafés have shisha (waterpipe). Most Egyptians indulge in the habit of smoking shisha while hanging out at the café, watching a match, studying, or even sometimes finishing some work. In Addis Ababa, the capital of Ethiopia, independent coffeehouses that struggled prior to 1991 have become popular with young professionals who do not have time for traditional coffee roasting at home. One establishment that has become well-known is the Tomoca coffee shop, which opened in 1953.

Europe

United Kingdom
The patrons of the first coffeehouse in England, The Angel, which opened in Oxford in 1650, and the mass of London coffee houses that flourished over the next three centuries, were far removed from those of modern Britain. Haunts for teenagers in particular, Italian-run espresso bars and their formica-topped tables were a feature of 1950s Soho that provided a backdrop as well as a title for Cliff Richard's 1960 film Expresso Bongo. The first was The Moka in Frith Street, opened by Gina Lollobrigida in 1953. With their "exotic Gaggia coffee machine[s],... Coke, Pepsi, weak frothy coffee and... Suncrush orange fountain[s]" they spread to other urban centers during the 1960s, providing cheap, warm places for young people to congregate and an ambience far removed from the global coffee bar standard that would be established in the final decades of the century by chains such as Starbucks and Pret a Manger.

Espresso bar

The espresso bar is a type of coffeehouse that specializes in coffee drinks made from espresso. Originating in Italy, the espresso bar has spread throughout the world in various forms. Prime examples that are internationally known are Starbucks Coffee, based in Seattle, U.S., and Costa Coffee, based in Dunstable, U.K. (the first and second largest coffeehouse chains respectively), although the espresso bar exists in some form throughout much of the world.

The espresso bar is typically centered around a long counter with a high-yield espresso machine (usually bean to cup machines, automatic or semiautomatic pump-type machine, although occasionally a manually operated lever-and-piston system) and a display case containing pastries and occasionally savory items such as sandwiches. In the traditional Italian bar, customers either order at the bar and consume their drinks standing or, if they wish to sit down and be served, are usually charged a higher price. In some bars there is an additional charge for drinks served at an outside table.  In other countries, especially the United States, seating areas for customers to relax and work are provided free of charge. Some espresso bars also sell coffee paraphernalia, candy, and even music. North American espresso bars were also at the forefront of widespread adoption of public WiFi access points to provide Internet services to people doing work on laptop computers on the premises.

The offerings at the typical espresso bar are generally quite Italianate in inspiration; biscotti, cannoli and pizzelle are a common traditional accompaniment to a caffe latte or cappuccino. Some upscale espresso bars even offer alcoholic drinks such as grappa and sambuca. Nevertheless, typical pastries are not always strictly Italianate and common additions include scones, muffins, croissants, and even doughnuts. There is usually a large selection of teas as well, and the North American espresso bar culture is responsible for the popularization of the Indian spiced tea drink masala chai. Iced drinks are also popular in some countries, including both iced tea and iced coffee as well as blended drinks such as Starbucks' Frappucino.

A worker in an espresso bar is referred to as a barista. The barista is a skilled position that requires familiarity with the drinks being made (often very elaborate, especially in North American-style espresso bars), a reasonable facility with some equipment as well as the usual customer service skills.

Gallery

See also

 Cat café
 Cha chaan teng, Hong Kong-style cafe
 Coffee service
 Death Cafe
 Dog café
 English coffeehouses in the 17th and 18th centuries
 Greasy spoon
 History of coffee
 Kafana
 Kissaten
 List of coffeehouse chains
 Manga café
 Teahouse
 Turkish coffee

References

Sources
 Abbas, H. (2014). "Coffee Houses, Early Public Libraries, and the Print Trade in Eighteenth-Century Dublin". Library & Information History 30(1), 41–61.

Further reading
 Marie-France Boyer; photographs by Eric Morin (1994) The French Café. London: Thames & Hudson
 Brian Cowan (2005), The Social Life of Coffee:  The Emergence of the British Coffeehouse, Yale University Press
 Markman Ellis (2004), The Coffee House: a cultural history, Weidenfeld & Nicolson
 Robert Hume "Percolating Society", Irish Examiner, 27 April 2017 p. 13
 Ray Oldenburg, The Great Good Place: Cafes, Coffee Shops, Community Centers, General Stores, Bars, Hangouts, and How They Get You through the Day. New York: Parragon Books, 1989. 
 Tom Standage (2006) A History of the World in Six Glasses, Walker & Company, 
 Ahmet Yaşar, "The Coffeehouses in Early Modern Istanbul: Public Space, Sociability and Surveillance", MA Thesis, Boğaziçi Üniversitesi, 2003. Library.boun.edu.tr
 Ahmet Yaşar, "Osmanlı Şehir Mekânları: Kahvehane Literatürü / Ottoman Urban Spaces: An Evaluation of Literature on Coffeehouses", TALİD Türkiye Araştırmaları Literatür Dergisi, 6, 2005, 237–256. Talid.org
 Antony Wild, Coffee, A Dark History, New York: W. W. Norton & Company, ; London: Fourth Estate, 2004 .
Nautiyal, J. J. (2016). "Aesthetic and affective experiences in coffee shops: a Deweyan engagement with ordinary affects in ordinary spaces". Education & Culture, 32(2), 99–118.
 Withington, Phil. "Public and private pleasures." History Today (June 2020) 70#6 pp. 16–18. covers London 1630 to 1800.
 Withington, Phil. "Where was the coffee in early modern England?." Journal of Modern History 92.1 (2020): 40–75.

 
Restaurants by type
Coffee culture
Arab inventions
Coffee